On 14 March 1961 an aircraft accident occurred near Yuba City, California. A United States Air Force B-52F-70-BW Stratofortress bomber, AF Serial No. 57-0166, c/n 464155, carrying two nuclear weapons departed from Mather Air Force Base near Sacramento. Increased fuel consumption caused by having to fly at lower altitude, combined with the inability to rendezvous with a tanker in time caused the aircraft to run out of fuel. The weapons did not detonate, as their safety devices worked properly. A fireman was killed and several others injured in a road accident while en route to the accident scene.

Timeline 

The following timeline is an abridged version of the description transcribed by Oskins and Maggelet from a declassified copy of the original Air Force accident report. Doe 11 was the aircraft call sign. Doe 13 was a second B-52 in formation for the first portion of the flight.

All times are hours and minutes after takeoff.

0:20  –  the pilot first noticed excessive hot air coming from the pilots' vents. All attempts to control this hot air were unsuccessful.

6:00  –  Mather Command Post contacted the aircraft on HF radio. The heat problem was discussed and wing guidance received. This consisted of several suggested corrective actions which were verified by the pilot as having been used earlier without success.

6:30  – Mather control room called the aircraft on HF radio and discussed the heat problem and the effects of the heat on the aircraft electronics and crew personnel. Wing guidance at this time was to continue the mission.

6:50  –  Mather control room contacted the aircraft and Wing guidance was to "continue mission as long as you can; call us back after second refueling tonight and advise us of your status, if it gets intolerable, of course, bring it home."

11:15  –  Mather control called Doe 11 to see if he would complete the mission. At that the response was, "We are going to try."

12:35  –  Mather control was contacted by Doe 11 and told that Doe 13's refueling was completed and "we are about ready to take off."  Control asked, "Your present status . . . has it improved?"  The pilot answered "Negative . . . worse . . . number 3 engine setting at 70% . . . we had it once before and it cleared up but at this time it has not cleared as yet."  Control advised, "Understand you will proceed on course and we will be looking for you tomorrow."

14:00  –  the outside panel of the pilot's L-4 window shattered. The heat in the cockpit was unbearable at this time and had cracked the glass case for the ball on both pilot's and co-pilot's turn and slip indicators. A decision was made to depressurize the aircraft and attempt to continue the mission.

15:00  –  Mather control contacted Doe 11 and asked "Which windshield is cracked and what is your present altitude?" Answer received, "The L-4 window shattered, heat unbearable at altitude, two sick crew members. They were advised to "proceed as planned, recommend you stay low altitude, give us an estimate on your fuel as soon as you get in close enough to contact us."

16:50  –  Mather control contacted Doe 11 via HF radio requesting ETA to Mather.

18:50  –  Mather control contacted the aircraft through HF radio to check his progress.

19:45  –  McClellan called for flight plan and altitude required from last position to Mather.

20:30  –  aircraft contacted McClellan to ask Early Warning vessel "Hardware" to look out for them and would like a fix.

21:00  –  the aircraft contacted Mather control stating, "We would like a tanker up here and get a little fuel. That is a little light. We would like to have a tanker." And, control answered Doe 11 "will be cleared for a straight in approach and will have tanker standby . . . we will not launch unless you go below ."

Doe 11's ETA to Mather at this time was given as approximately 22:30 hours after takeoff.

For approximately the next hour, several heading deviations up to 30 degrees were made by the pilot of Doe 11 to circumnavigate the weather associated with a front in this area. Turbulence was moderate. It is estimated from study of weather and Doe 11 pilot and navigator interviews that 7 or 8 minutes were lost during this frontal penetration due to these heading deviations.

We have No. 2 and one other 1/4 full warning light on and I think it would be a good idea to get that tanker airborne." Mather Control Room advised, "We have a tanker airborne. Pick him up at Red Bluff VOR and refuel back in this direction. You might keep in mind, if things get a little close up there, head into Beale AFB." Later in this same conversation, Mather control indicated, "We will get it off the ground here ASAP."

22:10  –  Democrat contacted the aircraft on HF advising, "McClellan is requesting your present position."  The aircraft advised, " . . . just coasted in and looking for our tanker."  This was the last contact through Democrat HF radio.

22:10  –  the tanker was launched.

This left Doe 11 flying at  IAS approximately  behind the tanker after the tanker rolled out on refueling track. The bomber asked the tanker to slow down. The tanker reduced speed to  IAS, and then to  IAS. The bomber maintained  IAS to approximately  behind this tanker, and then lost power. The pilot had warned the crew earlier of the possibility of bailout and he now alerted them to prepare for bailout. He initiated a 30-degree bank to the west toward a clear area as all engines flamed out together at approximately 22:40 hours after takeoff.

The gunner was called forward and bailed out the navigator hatch, using the spare chute in the forward compartment. The pilot continued to guide the aircraft toward a clear area. The crew continued to bail out in order of navigator, spare navigator, spare pilot, EW, gunner, co-pilot and radar navigator. The aircraft was trimmed and calculated to be at approximately a 21:1 glide ratio at this time. Impact angle was approximately 45 degrees.

Book
In a 2012 book, lieutenant colonel Earl McGill, a retired Strategic Air Command B-52 pilot, claims that the aircrew, after an inflight refueling session that provided inadequate fuel, refused the offer of an additional, unscheduled inflight refueling, bypassed possible emergency landing fields, and ran out of fuel. McGill, based on his experience, blames the aircrew failures on the use of dexedrine to overcome tiredness on the 24-hour flight preceding the accident.

See also

 List of accidents and incidents involving military aircraft

Notes

References

1961 in military history
Aviation accidents and incidents involving nuclear weapons
History of Sutter County, California
Aviation accidents and incidents in the United States in 1961
Aviation accidents and incidents in California
20th-century military history of the United States
Decompression accidents and incidents
Accidents and incidents involving the Boeing B-52 Stratofortress
Aviation accidents and incidents caused by fuel exhaustion
Yuba City B-52 crash
March 1961 events in the United States
Nuclear accidents and incidents in the United States